Few protests took place in December 2020 and there was no large-scale demonstrations in threat of the national security law. The imprisonment of Joshua Wong, Agnes Chow and Ivan Lam on 2 December aroused attention of the International community.

A Hong Kong media tycoon, Jimmy Lai, was charged with an offence under national security law. The charge was condemned by international community.

1 December

Police Sports & Recreation Club was bombed 
At about 1 am, ten petrol bombs were thrown at the open-air parking lot of the Police Sports & Recreation Club, and a truck was spread and burned. The police have dealt with an arson case, and three people are wanted. Police officers of a stormtrooper unit seized a pepper spray while intercepting a man on Shek Kip Mei Street near Fuk Wing Street. They were arrested for a while and finally stated that they had nothing to do with the case. On the 18 December, after checking a large number of CCTV footages, the police arrested three teenagers between the ages of 16 and 23 in Tai Wai, Kwai Chung and Tsim Sha Tsui, and seized raw materials for making petrol bombs on the rooftop of the 3-nil Building in Mong Kok. 3 people will be charged with arson and will appear in West Kowloon Magistrates' Court on the next day.

2 December

USCC published an annual report 
United States-China Economic and Security Review Commission published an annual report, which stated on Hong Kong that after the Chinese government passed and implemented the Hong Kong national security law, it placed 7.5 million Hong Kong people under authoritarian rule, at the expense of economic interests, the rule of law, and basic human rights. It is recommended that the US government remove visa barriers for Hong Kong people and study granting political asylum to Hong Kong people born after 1997. SAR government issued a statement in the early morning to strongly refute the report issued by the USCC, which it considers to be an unreasonable attack and false accusation. Commissioner's Office of the Ministry of Foreign Affairs in Hong Kong stated that the report was 'a piece of waste paper' and denounced the committee for gross interference in China's internal affairs and Hong Kong affairs, expressing its strong dissatisfaction and firm opposition to this.

HKBU student council president arrested 
At 7 am, Keith Fong, the acting president of the Hong Kong Baptist University Students’ Union, was arrested by the police and he was taken to the Sha Tin Police Station for detention. The charges were related to 'possession of offensive weapons in public places', 'resistance to police officers performing their duties' and 'obstructing police'. He was granted bail of HK$10,000 in the afternoon on charges such as perverting the course of justice, and the case will be brought to court on 8 December. When he left the police station, he stated that 20 police officers were present during the arrest, which he believed was a serious nuisance to the normal life of his family and neighbors. Describing the police action as 'secret police', he said "Today's Hong Kong is no longer the Hong Kong we have always known."

Sentencing of Joshua Wong, Agnes Chow, and Ivan Lam 

On 2 December, for the role of three former Demosistō member siege and surrounding Wan Chai Police Headquarters on 21 June 2019, West Kowloon Magistrate Courts sentenced Joshua Wong to 13 and a half months’ imprisonment, Agnes Chow sentenced to 10 months’ imprisonment, and Ivan Lam to 7 months’ imprisonment. Magistrate Wong Sze-lai also rejected Chow's application for bail appeal, describing Wong's deliberate efforts to siege the police with certain arrangements and plans, criticizing his behavior as "very selfish." However, Wong has 4 similar cases and requires additional punishment. After nightfall, more than a hundred people sent prison van outside the court, and a group of former scholars and former members of Hong Kong constituencies raised the banner of Scholarism at the intersection. After the prison van drove out, the supporters rushed up and slapped the window of the car and shouted desperately, "Hold on!" After Gwyneth Ho, a former reporter of Stand News, shared the clip on Facebook, she left messages expressing his touch and sadness.

German human rights report criticizes China 
German Ministry of Foreign Affairs released its biennial human rights report on 2 December. In its chapter on China, the report mentioned that the introduction of the Hong Kong national security law has made the situation worsening, and it will facilitate the Chinese security agencies to crack down on Hong Kong's civil society, opposition figures and people. The independent media has led to the failure of the 'one country, two systems' principle to ensure a high degree of autonomy in Hong Kong. It also pointed out that suppression, surveillance, and mass detention have occurred in Xinjiang. The report believes that although China passed the Civil Code this year, the judiciary still suffers Controlling the party does not guarantee the basic principles of a country under the rule of law.

3 December

Ted Hui went into exile 
Former Democratic Party member of the Legislative Council Ted Hui issued a statement on Facebook at about 8 pm, he officially announced that he would temporarily leave Hong Kong in exile and withdraw from the Democratic Party. He has not yet decided which country he will stay in.

4 December

Key image found in Chow Tsz-lok's cause of death 
On the day 15 of Chow Tsz-lok cause of death inquiries, the court first broadcast the "critical segment" discovered from the CCTV footage of Kwong Ming Court. The segment showed that a dark shadow fell from the parking lot at Sheung Tak Estate. The magistrate said, "I believe that the dark shadow belongs Chow." Chow's mother sobbed in the gallery after seeing the clip. The magistrate also pointed out that the time of parking and leaving of the ambulance A344 involved was not in accordance with the earlier testimony of the ambulanceman, and officially listed the Fire Services Department as a person with appropriate interests in the Coroner's Court. The magistrate adjourned the case until next Tuesday.

Yellow shop raid and arrests 

At about 9:30 pm, a large number of police officers broke into a well-known yellow shop in Mong Kok and searched the ground floor and rooftop, which aroused the attention of the public and the media. The staff said that they could not go to the rooftop during the police search. At about 1 am, the police took away two men, including Ivan Wong, the person in charge of the shop, and some objects, including helmets and telescopic batons. A parked van nearby was also intercepted by police officers, including several men and women on board. Shi Jingqian, known as the "Polytechnician", was intercepted by police for wearing a V-mask and wearing a light-shield flag, and was then taken into a police car. On the next day, Wong and his employees have been released on bail of HK$3,000 and will report to the police station on 5 January 2021.

5 December

Ted Hui in London 
Now News Channel exclusively filmed the former LegCo member Ted Hui arriving at London Heathrow Airport in the UK. During the interview, he said that he did not want to discuss details at the moment, describing that he felt heavy after arriving in the UK. Knowing that he going to be separated from Hong Kong and all the things he loves, he never having opportunity to go back. He also refused to disclose the whereabouts of his family, and did not want to talk more about whether to stay in the UK and what travel documents he used. A spokesperson for the Security Bureau issued a solemn statement, strongly condemning any fugitives who blatantly abandon security and absconded, describing it as "a shameful act of absconding in fear of crime." The police also strongly condemned the relevant actions and stated that they would trace the whereabouts of the fugitive suspect through various channels in accordance with the law and arrest him.

June 4th held an exchange meeting 
At 2 pm on the 5 December, an exchange meeting between witnesses of the 1989 Tiananmen Square protests and massacre and those of the Hong Kong Anti-China Movement was held in Pomona, Los Angeles. The exchange meeting was co-organized by the "Constitutionalism Research Association of the Exiles in Mainland China" and the "Far East Youth Freedom League". Fu Issa, the convener of the "Far East Youth Freedom League" Southern California, said that he participated in the protests in Hong Kong from June to August 2019 and witnessed the Hong Kong police violence with his own eyes. He believed that it was shortly after the outbreak of the anti-send movement. The Hong Kong police are using excessive violence; Xu Jie, the chairman of the "Constitution for the Study of the Constitutionalism of the Going to the Country", said that as a participant in the 1989 pro-democracy movement, he did not expect the Chinese Communist Party army to shoot in Beijing. After the June 4th massacre, he saw through the totalitarian nature of the CCP. It is also predicted that when Hong Kong's sovereignty is transferred to China in 1997, the CCP will also fully take over Hong Kong's governance. The two sides talked about the fact that the anti-transmission movement is more decentralized than the June 4th Movement, and it highlights the local and community demands. Participants in the anti-return movement also have no hope of "improving" the CCP. At the international level, both campaigns promoted the sanctions and isolation of the CCP by the international community, and they have great international influence.

6 December

Bauhinia Party established 
South China Morning Post reported that a group of business executives with mainland backgrounds, including the CEO of Silk Road Finance Co., Ltd. and a member of the National Committee of the Chinese People's Political Consultative Conference, Li Shan, together with Charles Wong, chairman of the Board of China Broadcasting Holdings, and Chen Jianwen, chairman of the Board of Bonjour Holdings, in May of the same year a new political party was established in Hong Kong called Bauhinia Party. According to the official website of the Hong Kong Companies Registry, this new political party was established on 14 May 2020. This new party only emerged after nearly seven months after its establishment, showing that a series of actions behind it have been planned for a long time.

7 December

CUHK protesters arrested 
National Security Department of the Hong Kong Police Force took over the investigation on the demonstration at Chinese University of Hong Kong last month and arrested 8 people, aged between 16 and 34, including Kwun Tong District Councillor Eason Chan and Sai Kung District Council Member Isaac Lee, and research assistant Arthur Yeung, all of whom were three graduates of CUHK. The police stated that they were suspected of participating in an unauthorized assembly. Three of them were arrested for inciting secession, and some of the arrested were not students or alumni of Chinese University. The police said that more people would be arrested.

Ted Hui and his family bank account are frozen 
After the former LegCo member, Ted Hui, announced his exile, the bank accounts of him and his family were frozen. They were once unfrozen, but they were frozen again on 7 December. HSBC said it would not comment on individual cases, but said that the relevant facts were distorted and not completely frozen, and that the parents' accounts were not affected. Hui later pointed out on Facebook that the account was completely frozen, and asked HSBC to respond positively and clarify which aspect was distorted and fully disclosed the incident. He said the incident affected the confidence of all HSBC customers in Hong Kong and the world.

Senior Superintendent of the National Security Department of the Hong Kong Police, Li Kwai-wah, did not call the name to respond to Hui's account being frozen, saying that the social networking site of the person concerned has been suspected of colluding with foreign forces, such as 'widening the international front in Hong Kong.'

In the evening, Hui stated on Facebook that the police involved in embezzling HK$850,000 in crowdfunding was purely discrediting, and disclosed the relevant crowdfunding records. He urges the police to produce objective evidence and criticize the police for suppressing and discrediting dissidents.

U.S. sanctions 14 vice chairmen of the National People's Congress 
Reuters quoted news reports that in response to the 4 pro-democracy legislators in the Hong Kong government earlier, the United States is preparing to sanction 14 NPC officials and Chinese officials. The initial news stated that Hong Kong officials are likely to be included. The final sanctions were Wang Chen, member of the Political Bureau of the CPC Central Committee and vice chairman of the Standing Committee of the National People's Congress. Also sanctioned are vice chairman of the Standing Committee of the National People's Congress Cao Jianming, Zhang Chunxian and Bai Ma Chilin and others. U.S. Secretary of State Mike Pompeo issued a statement on the same day, accusing Beijing of continuously undermining Hong Kong's democratic procedures, causing the Hong Kong Legislative Council to exist in name only and degenerate into a rubber stamp that no longer has any meaningful opposition forces.

U.S. House of Representatives passes the Hong Kong People's Freedom and Choice Act 
U.S. House of Representatives passed the Hong Kong People's Freedom and Choice Act without any objection. The bill will be submitted to the Senate for deliberation and will be submitted to the President for signature after a vote by the Senate.

8 December

Pan-democrats arrested 
In the morning, the police came to arrest at least 8 members of the pro-democracy camp. The arrested persons included Democratic Party chairman Wu Chi-wai, vice chairman of League of Social Democrats Leung Kwok-hung, Member Deng Shili, Civil Human Rights Front convener Figo Chan, former LegCo member Eddie Chu, Eastern district councillor Tsang Kin-shing, Lancelot Chan, and Chui Chi-kin. According to reports, the arrest was related to the unlawful assembly outside the Court of Final Appeal and the 1 July parade on 30 June 2020. They were suspected of inciting others to knowingly participate in an unauthorized assembly, organizing unlawful assembly and taking part in an unlawful assembly. They will appear at West Kowloon Magistrates' Court on 17 December.

Church raided and its bank account are frozen 
Good Neighborhood North District, which had organized the Guardian Action in the anti-extradition bill protest, stated that the HSBC bank accounts of the church and the pastor and preacher Ray Chan and his wife were frozen. In the evening, the police arrested a former female director and a former female employee of the church, suspected of concealing the receipt of 18 million yuan in donations and money laundering in the crowdfunding activities in the name of religion and supporting youth, which was higher than the amount raised by the church more than HK$8.9 million. The police have asked HSBC to freeze the five bank accounts involved in the case, involving a total of HK$25 million. The police also stated that the group directors and company secretaries involved in the case had left Hong Kong in mid-October this year.

Carrie Lam interviewed by The Wall Street Journal 
Chief Executive Carrie Lam participated in the Wall Street Journal CEO Council Summit on 7 to 8 December and accepted a video interview from reporters. She said that the core values of Hong Kong's success, such as the rule of law, judicial independence, and citizens' rights and freedoms, will continue to be fully protected under one country, two systems. She also said that with the support of the central government, Hong Kong will play an important role in the development of the country, especially in the development of the Guangdong-Hong Kong-Macao Greater Bay Area. Hong Kong's prospects are unlimited and enterprises should seize good opportunities to invest in Hong Kong.

China condemns US for passing Hong Kong People's Freedom and Choice Act by House of Representatives 
Hong Kong and Macau Affairs Office of the State Council issued a statement condemning the US sanctions against 14 vice-chairmen of the Standing Committee of the National People's Congress. It criticized the US sanctions for completely violating international law and basic norms of international relations, and it was 'hysterical political bullying.' It stated that the United States itself has established an airtight legal system for safeguarding national security, wantonly slandering, grossly interfering, and savagely suppressing China's legitimate actions in safeguarding national security and the constitutional order of the SAR, describing it as 'blatant double standards and robber logic.' The statement finally quoted the Western proverb, "God must first make it mad if he wants to perish."

Hong Kong Liaison Office issued a statement stating that it strongly condemns the US sanctions, pointing out that it is a political bullying that seriously violates international law and the basic norms of international relations. It stated will never fear any arbitrary hegemony, and will never tolerate the rudeness of the United States in Hong Kong affairs and China's internal affairs. It stated that intervention will never shake the firm determination to safeguard national sovereignty, security and development interests.

Commissioner's Office of the Ministry of Foreign Affairs in Hong Kong stated that it expresses its strong indignation against the US sanctions against the Vice Chairman of the Standing Committee of the National People's Congress and the passage of the Hong Kong People's Freedom and Choice Act by the House of Representatives. Disturbances in Hong Kong, stop undermining the rule of law and judicial independence in the SAR.

US diplomat summoned by Beijing 
Chinese Vice Foreign Minister Zheng Zeguang summoned Robert W. Forden, the Chargé d'affaires of the US Embassy in China, to lodge a solemn protest against the US sanctions against the vice chairman of the National People's Congress. Zheng pointed out that the US sanctions against the 14 vice-chairmen of the Standing Committee of the National People's Congress of China severely violated the basic norms of international relations, seriously interfered in China's internal affairs, severely undermined China-US relations, arbitrarily unreasonable, and bad in nature. China expresses its strong indignation and strongly condemns it. He also criticized the US as an excuse for safeguarding Hong Kong's democracy, human rights, and autonomy, using various means to intervene in Hong Kong affairs, encouraging illegal and criminal activities that support the secession of the country and disrupting social order, and imposing sanctions on officials of the Chinese Central Government and the Hong Kong government, and pointed out that all these are sufficient. It proves that the United States is the biggest man behind the chaos in Hong Kong. It is true that the United States is concerned about Hong Kong's democracy, human rights, and autonomy, and it is true to mess up Hong Kong and undermine China's stable development.

9 December

Agnes Chow bail denied 
On 9 December, jailed activist Agnes Chow applied for bail again in the Court of First Instance of the High Court. After hearing the arguments of both parties, Judge Judianna Barnes believed that the applicant did not show a high or reasonable chance of successful appeal, and decided to reject Chow's application for bail. The court will explain the reasons in writing later.

Nathan Law meets British politicians 
UK Home Secretary Priti Patel met with former Demosistō member Nathan Law who had fled to London, and Beatrice Li, the younger sister of Hong Kong Story member Andy Li, who was detained in Shenzhen after failing to escape to Taiwan. She pointed out that the United Kingdom would stand shoulder to shoulder with Hong Kong people and abide by fulfill the promise and defend the freedom of Hong Kong people. Hong Kong government subsequently issued a statement accusing the British side that when signing the Sino-British Joint Declaration, it made a clear promise not to grant Hong Kong citizens who hold British National (Overseas) passports the right of abode in the UK. It would be disregarding history to violate the facts and international obligations.

10 December

Carrie Lam interviewed by The Wall Street Journal 
In an interview with The Wall Street Journal, Hong Kong Chief Executive Carrie Lam described that no country will tolerate treason and overthrow the government in recent different incidents. At the same time, it pointed out that there have been many unfair comments on Hong Kong in recent incidents, reflecting that many people did not fully understand the one country, two systems. She also described the anti-extradition bill protests in June last year as a continuous monthly riot, which was formulated by the Standing Committee of the National People's Congress. After the national security law was passed, the law and order in Hong Kong have been restored. She pointed out that Hong Kong has unlimited prospects and companies should seize this good opportunity to invest in Hong Kong.

11 December

Jimmy Lai charged with national security law 
National Security Department of the Hong Kong Police Force officially charged Jimmy Lai, the founder of Next Digital for colluding with foreign forces, becoming the first person to be charged with this crime after the Hong Kong national security law took effect. The chairman of Civic Party and Senior Counsel Alan Leong estimated that the police believed that Lai had discussed the situation in Hong Kong with foreign politicians on Twitter earlier, or mentioned that he called for foreign support for Hong Kong during interviews by foreign media. The case was brought to the West Kowloon Magistrate Courts on 12 December.

In addition, Tony Chung, a former convener of Studentlocalism who was remanded in custody for violating the national security law, was convicted for desecrating Chinese national flag in the demonstration area of the Legislative Council on 14 May 2019. The national flag, he denied the two crimes of insulting the national flag and illegal assembly. The case was brought to the Eastern Magistrate Courts on 11 December. Magistrate Huang Yayin alleged that he had taken the initiative to grab the five-star red flag and then broke the flagpole, and then tossed the flag in mid-air as a deliberate insult. He was found guilty of two counts. The court adjourned the case until 29 December for sentencing, and the defendant must continue to be remanded in custody.

Baggio Leung went into exile 
Baggio Leung, who was disqualified as a LegCo member in 2016, said through the media and overseas Hong Kong people's organization Haven Assistance that he left Hong Kong on 30 November and arrived in the United States the next day. He appeared in Washington, D.C. and applied for asylum. Radio Free Asia’s YouTube channel uploaded an interview with Leung, stating that he severed all ties with his family. At the end of September, after he was released from prison, he was found being followed and worried about his own safety, so he decided to leave Hong Kong. He hopes that the White House can provide a lifeboat plan to Hong Kong residents who were born after 1997 and do not have a British National (Overseas) passport.

Police fined 17 people for violating gathering restrictions 
The fixed fines for the gathering restriction order and mask order have been increased from HK$2,000 to HK$5,000. At 8 pm, the police received a report saying that someone had gathered outside Sai Yeung Choi Street in Mong Kok without wearing a mask. After the police arrived at the scene, they asked the people present to stop gathering and leave immediately. However, they were ignored. In the end, 13 men and 2 women were involved in breaching the gathering restriction order, aged between 45 and 76, and issued fixed penalty notices to them. Two other men were accused of not wearing masks and were charged. And a 73-year-old man who was wanted was taken away by the police.

12 December

Pro-independence activist Andy Chan acquitted 

Former Hong Kong National Party convener Andy Chan was charged with participating in unlawful assembly and slapped the police chief's helmet after the Liberate Sheung Shui rally on 13 July last year. He earlier denied the crime of illegal assembly and assaulting the police. Magistrate Wong Sze-lai pointed to the dispute whether the offender is really the defendant, the prosecutor lacks direct evidence, and the opinions and environmental evidence of expert witnesses are also difficult to identify. Based on the doubts, the interests are attributed to the defendant, and the two crimes are ruled not guilty and released in court. After the court announced the verdict, someone in the auditorium clapped and cheered. Chan hugged Grandma Wong outside the courtroom. In an interview with reporters, he stated that the case "reflects the existence of a lot of indiscriminate arrests and accusations," and also said that "it is more comfortable to stay in Hong Kong," and it may not be better to leave Hong Kong. He also sent a message to the people of Hong Kong: "No matter where we Hong Kong people are, we must persist in our efforts to survive and survive, and to survive and survive together for our goals."

12 Hong Kong activist's family letter urges lawyers in Hong Kong committee to plead guilty to Hong Kong 

The 12 Hong Kong Residents Concern Group launched the One Person, One Card campaign for Christmas warming, calling on the public to send Christmas cards to 12 Hong Kong activists and wishing them to return home as soon as possible The family members of 12 Hong Kong activists who were detained in Shenzhen for more than 100 days held a press conference. The family members of at least two of them received letters from the arrested. Some family members received calls from lawyers who claimed to be mainland officials. Among them, Andy Li's parents said that the family letter required them to appoint a lawyer in Hong Kong to confess to the crimes of rioting and assaulting the police in Hong Kong. The father questioned the difference between the judicial system in the Mainland and Hong Kong, and believed that the request was suspicious. The mother was worried that she would be tortured to extract a confession, so she was forced to write a letter asking for a confession. Wong Wai-yin's wife said that he received two calls from an official lawyer to inquire about the relationship between Huang and the other arrested persons, describing it as a migration. The family of Tang Kai-yin received a notice from the Bank of China that Tang's account was terminated due to commercial administrative reasons. Former LegCo member James To said on behalf of the mother of the underage arrested Huang Linfu that he received a call from the local, but the other party only spoke Mandarin. When Wong's mother asked the other party to speak Cantonese, the other party immediately closed the line and did not call afterwards. Hoang Lam Phuc's family hoped that the Vietnamese consul in Guangzhou could visit her son on her behalf.

13 December

Tsang Chi-kin's girlfriend seeking asylum in the UK 
Apple Daily reported that Tsang Chi-kin, who was shot in the chest by a police officer during a demonstration in Tsuen Wan on 1 October 2019, and his 15-year-old girlfriend sought political asylum after arriving in London last week. This is the youngest confirmed exile protest. By. It was reported that she had participated in the demonstration and was arrested, but was not prosecuted because she was under 16 years old. Friends of Hong Kong, the British organization for assisting exiles, which is responsible for assisting the girl, issued a statement stating that she had been followed by unknown persons before leaving Hong Kong and that she would try to assist her in life after arriving in the UK. It also claimed that she was suffering from depression and would provide her psychological counseling and thank the British government for granting her political asylum.

Police welfare fund donations rise by HK$170 million 
Security Bureau submitted the 2019/2020 annual report of the Police Welfare Fund to the Legislative Council. The total expenditure was HK$114 million, which was nearly twice the previous year. The main reason was the cost of refreshments for police officers holding special positions. The total annual income of the fund was HK$188 million, an increase of 8.66 times compared to the previous year's 6.3 million, mainly including an increase of HK$173 million in donation income, an increase of more than 26 times. Many establishment organizations also donated, but the report did not list the donors. Former LegCo member and vice-chairman of the Democratic Party, Lam Cheuk-ting criticized the "corruption of discipline" and questioned that the donations of relevant people caused the police to "let go".

The police stated that in the 2019-2020 fiscal year, they received a large number of inquiries from the public, stating that the police officers showed a high degree of professionalism and perseverance in handling illegal acts in anti-extradition bill protests, and hoped to express their support to the police through donations. On the other hand, the average expenditure per person per day for refreshments for police officers holding special duties is less than HK$7.

15 December

Slogan in Tai O suspected violating National Security Law 
EARTH.er, a clothing store in Tai O's environmental protection mountain, posted on Facebook, claiming that someone complained about the sensitive slogan “Revolution is not guilty, recovery is reasonable” adapted from the famous saying of former Chinese Communist Party Chairman Mao Zedong on its gate. Afterwards, a police officer arrived and recorded the owner's personal profile. He questioned "Which sentence is sensitive? What about guilty of the law?" The police urged him to check the national security law on the internet by himself. The owner described the incident as white terror. Police Public Relations Branch replied that it received a report from the public that the words outside the gate were suspected of violating the national security law. Later, officers from the South Lantau Division were reported to the scene. After preliminary investigation, the case did not involve criminal elements and was classified as a miscellaneous incident.

Bookazine bans the sale of Hong Kong chronicles of American writers due to the National Security Law 
Hong Kong Free Press reported that the new book Frontline Hong Kong 1997–2020, published by the American writer Kent Ewing was originally scheduled to be released in September this year. However, the Hong Kong bookstore chain Bookazine banned the sale of related books. After the law, the bookstore hopes to keep a low-key stay 'under the radar', so the book will not be stored in the store for sale. The publisher Form Asia also sent an email to the author in September, stating that based on a series of reasons, it decided not to publish the book and was eventually cancelled. The author Kent Ewing published an article in Hong Kong Free Press, saying that the book covers the 1997 handover, three generations of chief executives and the 2014 Umbrella Movement, etc., describing the book as ill-fated.

British Foreign Minister urges Hong Kong government to stop targeting Jimmy Lai 
British Foreign Secretary Dominic Raab said on 14 December that the Hong Kong national security law continued to attack the rights and freedoms of Hong Kong people, and violated the Sino-British Joint Declaration, calling on the Hong Kong government to stop targeting Hong Kong democrats and Hong Kong people, including media founder Jimmy Lai.

17 December

Former Scholarism member Frances Hui announced her departure from Hong Kong 
Frances Hui, a 21-year-old member of the disbanded Scholarism, left a message on social platforms, saying that she had received multiple warnings a few months ago. She was originally scheduled to study journalism at Emerson College in Boston, Massachusetts. After graduating this summer, she decided to continue staying there because she will not return to Hong Kong. She describes that she can't return to Hong Kong for one lifetime, it will be a heavy price to cut off contact with her loved ones. She will continue to speak out for the silent in US.

Multiple statistics show that Hong Kong is erupting an unprecedented wave of immigration 
A reporter from Radio Free Asia checked a number of recent statistics and pointed out that many middle-class people in Hong Kong have already planned to immigrate in response to political uncertainties in 2019. After the implementation of the Hong Kong national security law, they are more quickly prepared for immigration, including continued to obtain British National (Overseas) passports and apply for offshore accounts, etc. According to Google search trends, keywords related to immigration and offshore accounts have become popular search keywords, and related words have soared from 17 to 23 May. And Ted Hui, a former member of the Democratic, announced his exile on 3 December. After his and his family's bank accounts were frozen, the search for the 'offshore account Citibank' also soared. According to the number of police applications for the issuance of Non-Criminal Record Certificates, starting from the anti-extradition bill protests in June 2019, more than 3,000 certificates have been issued per month, a record high in recent years. Economist Law Ka-chung estimates that most of the people who are planning to emigrate are the middle class and the lower-middle class. "The poorest and the richest can't leave." Chung Kim-wah, deputy chief executive of the Hong Kong Public Opinion Research Institute (PORI), pointed out that Hong Kong people's current immigration is for the sake of their children's education and concerns about Hong Kong's political situation. He also described the current Hong Kong people's 'panic' mentality.

19 December

Police Sports & Recreation Club bombing suspects brought to court 
In the early morning of 1 December, the Police Sports & Recreation Club was bombed by molotov cocktails. After checking a large number of CCTV footages, the police arrested three young people aged 16 to 23 in Tai Wai, Kwai Chung and Tsim Sha Tsui, and seized the manufacture on the rooftop of the 3-nil Building in Mong Kok. The raw materials of petrol bombs, three people will be charged with arson and will appear in West Kowloon Magistrates' Courts. The charge is that they used fire to damage a police van worth HK$1 million in the parking lot of the Police Sports & Recreation Club on 1 December, with the intention of damaging the property or ignoring whether the property would be damaged. The three people do not need to respond for the time being. The case was postponed until 24 December when police conduct the identification procedures of the three prosecution witnesses. The three defendants are not allowed to be released on bail and must be remanded in custody.

Mike Pompeo: 12 Hongkongers are trying to escape from tyranny 
U.S. Secretary of State Mike Pompeo posted on Twitter that the 12 Hong Kong people suspected of crossing the border were only trying to escape tyranny, criticizing the CCP for turning Hong Kong into the former East Berlin and actively preventing Hong Kong people from seeking freedom elsewhere. The spokesperson of the SAR government responded that the 12 fugitives were wanted in Hong Kong and were evading legal responsibility. The remarks of US officials disregard the facts and confuse right from wrong, expressing firm opposition and strong dissatisfaction with this.

Glory to Hong Kong International Peers Music Rally 
A British human rights organization Hong Kong Watch, which is concerned about Hong Kong affairs, broadcast the program Glory Hong Kong International Traveler conducted from Toronto, Canada at 10 pm Hong Kong time, in support of the imprisoned protesters and 12 Hong Kong people. The program was hosted by Cheng Jingji and invited a number of guests to give video speeches, including former Hong Kong governor Chris Patten, U.S. Senator Marco Rubio, who is tough on China, and Canadian Conservative Party leader Erin O'Toole and other politicians, as well as a number of exiles wanted by the Hong Kong police, including Ray Wong, a former spokesperson of Hong Kong Indigenous, Finn Lau, activist known as 'I want lam chau' in the United Kingdom, Ted Hui, a former legislator, and former Demosistō member Nathan Law will also speak. The show also sings a number of songs created during the anti-extradition bill protests.

21 December

Court of Final Appeal ruled mask ban was constitutional 

Court of Final Appeal ruled that the government's appeal was straightforward. The Emergency Regulations Ordinance enacted the Prohibition on Face Covering Regulation to be constitutional, and the mask ban is applicable to illegal assemblies and legal demonstrations. The relevant case was heard by the Chief Justice Geoffrey Ma, the three permanent judges Roberto Ribeiro, Joseph Fok and Andrew Cheung, and the non-permanent judge Lord He Fuming, and a unanimous decision was made. The final decision  agrees that the key to the ban on masking is the prevention and deterrent nature, which can avoid violence in peaceful assemblies, pointing out that the mask ban law is beneficial to society. Democrats must also pay legal costs to the government. Leung Kwok-hung, one of the appellants, expressed disappointment at the verdict. This is a very harsh practice and questioned whether the speech of the National People's Congress overrides the local judiciary. Figo Chan, the convener of the Civil Human Rights Front, criticized the ruling as absurd. The ruling made citizens lose their freedom to speak out without fear. Netizens questioned whether the verdict mentions stopping the vehicle for extortion of money is 'fake news,' and related reports have been reported in many pro-organized media.

Journalists lost legal challenges at High Court 
Hong Kong Journalists Association earlier filed a judicial review, alleging that police officers repeatedly obstructed reporters' interviews and used excessive force on reporters during the anti-extradition bill protests last year. Judge Anderson Chow of the High Court pointed out that the two parties had disputes over some of the allegations in the case, and the allegations could not be confirmed. He ruled that they lost the case. Hong Kong Journalists Association, which is responsible for filing, expressed extreme disappointment.

12 family members of Hong Kong people submit a petition letter to the Immigration Department 
12 Hong Kong activists families are on the day of the winter solstice, and they submit a petition letter to the Wan Chai Immigration Tower, requesting prescription assistance and accompanying their family members to the Mainland for hearings. In the open letter, family members put forward five requirements to the mainland authorities, including that the trial should be made public and broadcast live; family members should be notified no less than 20 days before the trial, and virus testing and other arrangements should be conducted early, or test results can be used instead of compulsory quarantine; The indictment and the transcript of the meeting, and the list of court composition are published; the identity and contact methods of all official lawyers are notified; and the lawyers entrusted by the family members to defend.

Nathan Law applied for political asylum in the UK 
Nathan Law, a former Demosistō member living overseas, said that he would apply for political asylum in the UK. He claimed that he was listed as a wanted criminal under the national security law and could not return to his hometown. And if he does not act, he will become a person without a passport or identity. He also said that "I will never give up my identity as a Hong Kong citizen."

22 December

U.S. Department of Commerce blacklists flight services 
U.S. Department of Commerce has published a blacklist of 103 Chinese and Russian entities, alleging that they are connected to the military. This includes the Hong Kong Government Flying Service, which will be restricted from purchasing various American products and technologies. When West Wu Wai-hung, the director of the Government Flying Service, was inquired by the mainland media, he said that he was very sorry about the incident, but he would stick to his professionalism to ensure that the service would not be affected.

Tsang Chi-kin went into exile 
A student, Tsang Chi-kin, who was shot and injured by a police officer during the demonstration in Tsuen Wan on 1 October 2019, did not attend the District Court hearing. Judge Justin Ko issued an arrest warrant. The organization Friends of Hong Kong, issued a statement on behalf of Tsang, stating that on 27 October, he and others went to the U.S. Consulate in Hong Kong for help, but was asked to leave by the staff 'unable to help'. The statement stated that Tsang and others are currently living with a U.S. citizen and did not disclose their current location.

Police officer showing reporter's ID card in front of camera violates privacy regulations 
Office of the Privacy Commissioner for Personal Data issued an investigation report, stating that on 26 December last year, police officers displayed the ID card of Stand News reporter Ronson Chan in front of the camera for about 40 seconds at the Tai Po Mega Mall, violating the data protection of the Privacy Ordinance in principle. The police said they accepted the report and have reprimanded the police officer involved. Chan responded that he welcomed the Privacy Commissioner's report very much, but at the same time he said that the police deliberately violated the law and knowing that they violated the law.

23 December

Jimmy Lai released on bail 
On 23 December, media tycoon Jimmy Lai was released on bail for HK$10 million, after his bail application was granted by High Court judge Alex Lee. But his bail conditions was very harsh, because he has to surrender his travel documents, not taking interviews with local and foreign media in any form, not leaving Hong Kong, not making any public statement which endangers national security, not meeting with foreign officials, no posting on social media, not publishing articles, but he only can go out for reporting to police.

Chinese state-owned media have denounced Lai's release. People's Daily, a CCP mouthpiece newspaper, stated the release are severely undermining rule of law and he must be punished. Lai was described by the newspaper as notorious and extremely dangerous.

24 December

Police guarding multi-zone amid call by netizens 

On Christmas Eve, netizens plan to hold a candlelight gathering at the Hundred Step Ladder of Sha Tin Town Hall, Yuen Long West Rail station, Kwun Tong Promenade and Victoria Park Basketball Court in Causeway Bay. The police patrolled and guarded closely in many districts, and intercepted citizens and reporters. No crowds were seen. In Sha Tin, two 12-year-old and 13-year-old teenagers were found with weapons such as air guns and were arrested on suspicion of possessing imitation firearms. After Yuen Long District Councillor Ng Kin-wai appeared at the Yuen Long West Rail station, he was also intercepted by several police officers and asked to leave.

In addition, a number of police officers were on guard near the Tsim Sha Tsui Ferry Pier. Alexandra Wong, known as 'Grandma Wong', showed off the 'Save12' light board and shouted anti-extradition bill protests slogans, attracting the public to watch. While some people filmed a large number of Speed Tactical Contingent on guard in Mong Kok, Yau Tsim Mong District Councillor Ben Lam criticized that the police action completely destroyed the Christmas Eve atmosphere and made passers-by feeling unsafe.

Lennon Talk exhibition was suppressed by the Food and Environmental Hygiene Department 
Some citizens took advantage of the Christmas holiday to hold the Lennon Talk exhibition and Christmas market in Mong Kok. However, on the opening day, staff from Food and Environmental Hygiene Department visited twice. The staff pointed out that they received complaints from the public and carried out law enforcement and were on the scene. Take photos for records. The staff needs to be closed on the grounds of a gathering restriction order and reserves the right to prosecute. In the end, the organizer had no choice but to pull up all the exhibition boards, leaving only the Christmas market and a few decorations. One of the person in charge of the event criticized the government for suppressing moderate voices and felt uncomfortable.

27 December

30 Hong Kong activists overseas are wanted 
South China Morning Post reported that about 30 Hong Kong activists overseas were wanted by the police for violating the Hong Kong national security law, including former LegCo members Ted Hui and Baggio Leung, and former spokespersons of now-defunct Hong Kong Higher Institutions International Affairs Delegation Sunny Cheung, who left Hong Kong earlier, and Brian Leung, former editor-in-chief of Undergrad. The report quoted police sources as saying that there are about 30 Hong Kong activists on the wanted list. They are not currently in Hong Kong, and most of them live in Europe, United States and Taiwan.

28 December

Lam Cheuk-ting rearrested by ICAC 
In the morning, Lam Cheuk-ting, the vice chairman of the Democratic Party and a former LegCo member, was arrested by the Independent Commission Against Corruption. He was accused of being involved in disclosing the identity of the person under investigation in the Yuen Long 721 incident and was charged with three cases of disclosing the identity of the person under investigation. The case will appear in Eastern Magistrates' Court in the afternoon. Chief Magistrate Bina Chainrai adjourned the case until March 9, 2021. Lam was released on bail of HK$2,000, during which time he was not allowed to leave Hong Kong and must live at the reported address.

10 Hong Kong people set a date for trial and sentence 
People's Court of Yantian District, Shenzhen tried 12 Hong Kong activists absconding cases, and 10 of them appeared in court. In the evening of the same day, the Yantian Court issued a notice stating that after the Yantian Court heard the opinions of the procuratorial organs and the defense opinions of the defendants and the entrusted lawyers, the case will be sentenced at a fixed time. Official media confirmed that 10 defendants pleaded guilty in court, hoping that the court will be punished lightly. The other two underage suspects will set a date for a closed-door hearing at the Procuratorate.

US urges China to release 12 Hong Kong activists 
U.S. Embassy in China issued a statement calling on the Chinese authorities to immediately release 12 Hong Kong activists and allow them to leave China. The statement stated that "the so-called "crime" of their (12 Hong Kong people) is to escape tyranny. Communist China will desperately prevent the people from seeking freedom elsewhere". In response, Chinese Foreign Ministry spokesperson Zhao Lijian said that he criticized the relevant US remarks for ignoring facts and confusing right from wrong and expressed firm opposition.

Captain America 2.0 writes pro-independence messages on the wall of the detention center 
In the evening, the Correctional Services Department issued a press release stating that a remand person in the Lai Chi Kok Reception Centre had written a sentence on the wall of the cell that was suspected of promoting the independence of Hong Kong. This morning, the remand person was quarantined and investigated, and the incident was passed on. Police investigation. The press release revealed that the person in custody was remanded for inciting others to split the country in November this year. The media estimated that the person involved was Adam Ma Chun-man (a.k.a. Captain America 2.0).

30 December

Sentencing of 12 Hong Kong activists 

Yantian District People's Court of Shenzhen City pronounced a sentence on the case of 12 Hong Kong activists arrested for smuggling across the border in the Mainland. Tang Kai-yin, accused of organizing others to cross the border, was sentenced to 3 years in prison, and Quinn Moon was sentenced to 2 years in prison, with fines of 20,000 and 15,000 respectively. As for Cheng Tsz-ho, Yim Man-him, Cheung Ming-yu, Cheung Chun-fu, Wong Wai-yin, Li Tsz-yin, Andy Li, and Kok Tse-lun who were convicted of the crime of crossing the border, they were sentenced to 7 months in prison and fined 10,000 yuan. Xinhua News Agency reported that Quinn Moon choked a few times in her statement, saying that "I have recognized the fairness, fairness and rigor of the rule of law in the Mainland, and I have also obtained my due rights". She also claimed that many defendants had credulously believed in other people's rumors in the past, "There is a serious misunderstanding of the law enforcement and judicial institutions in the Mainland."

As for the two minors, Liu Sze-man and Hoang Lam Phuc, the Shenzhen authorities believed that they had not been prosecuted and the legal process had been completed. The Shenzhen police handed over to the Hong Kong police via the Shenzhen Bay Port, and then the two were taken to the Tin Shui Wai Police Station for investigation, seeking instructions from the court and the Department of Justice to take further action. The family and lawyers of Liu Sze-man and Hoang Lam Phuc met with the two briefly. They said that they were nervous and were reluctant to mention the situation in the Yantian Detention Center. Owen Chow, who assisted the families of 12 Hong Kong residents, questioned that 12 Hong Kong residents had been tortured in the Mainland.

At night, the police stated that they would apply to the court to postpone their cases for 14 days and let them complete quarantine. It does not rule out accusing them of failure to be imprisoned in accordance with the court's designation. The 12 Hong Kong Resident Concern Group issued a statement describing that the entire judicial process is a farce. Among them, Tang's family said that they are most worried about the child's mental and psychological state, and they have no expectations about whether they can visit the prison in Shenzhen. Some family members who did not want to be named believed that Tang Kai-yin and Quinn Moon had been sentenced too severely as accomplices.

Sentencing of a male mechanic 
A 19-year-old male mechanic pulled up a tape on Tong Ming Street, Tseung Kwan O, to block the road on February 5, 2020, and resisted when he was arrested outside Beverly Garden at 1 Tong Ming Street. 2 Police Constables-Sergeant 3617 and Police Constable 17569 pushed down. The police officer accused of causing obstruction in public places and resisting the performance of his duties has two crimes. The mechanic pleaded guilty earlier. Magistrate Ivy Leung pointed out that even though the police officer involved was only slightly injured, the defendant's behavior was disregarding police safety, so custodial punishment was appropriate to reflect the severity and protect the police officers on duty. As for the allegation of blocking the road in the first charge, she agreed that it was early in the morning and the scope of influence was limited. However the defendant argued that he committed the crime because of playfulness, reflecting his weak awareness of law-abiding, so it was decided to sentence the defendant to a rehabilitation center so that he could learn from it. Rehabilitation of skills and raising awareness of law-abiding.

31 December

Jimmy Lai bail revoked and ordered to remand in prison 

Founder of Next Digital, Jimmy Lai, was charged with fraud and violation of the Hong Kong national security law. Earlier, he was granted bail by the High Court. Department of Justice appealed against the decision and applied for a temporary remand order, describing the charges in the national security law as life-long prisoners. Similar to murder or treason. Court of Final Appeal allowed the Attorney General's application for bail appeal for Lai, which must be remanded immediately. The court held that the judge of the High Court, Alex Lee, may have misapplied Article 42 of the national security law when handling relevant bail applications. He was again locked and handcuffed with a chain around his waist and taken by a prison car to Lai Chi Kok Reception Center.

Agnes Chow moved to high-security prison 
Hong Kong media reported on 31 December that now-jailed activist Agnes Chow was moved from Lo Wu Correctional Institution to Tai Lam Centre for Women, where she was previously remanded until sentenced on 2 December. The move reason that she is now a Category A prisoner. Correctional Services Department declined to comment on Chow's case, saying only that crimes committed, length of sentence and the extent to which someone was a security risk would all be taken into account.

References 

Timeline of the 2019–2020 Hong Kong protests
Lists of protests
2020 timelines